Juan Antonio Coloma Correa (born 15 July 1956) is a Chilean politician who currently serves as a member of the Senate of Chile. Similarly, he is father of the deputy Juan Antonio Coloma Álamos. On 15 March 2023, he was elected President of the Senate.

References

External links
 BCN Profile

1956 births
Living people
Chilean people of Basque descent
Pontifical Catholic University of Chile alumni
Independent Democratic Union politicians
Senators of the LV Legislative Period of the National Congress of Chile
Senators of the LVI Legislative Period of the National Congress of Chile